Arthur Otto "Scoop" Scharein (June 30, 1905 – July 2, 1969) was a third baseman in Major League Baseball. He played for the St. Louis Browns.

References

External links

1905 births
1969 deaths
Major League Baseball third basemen
St. Louis Browns players
Minor league baseball managers
Baseball players from Illinois
Sportspeople from Decatur, Illinois